"Vortex" is a maxi-single by the Japanese rock band, The Gazette. It was released on May 25, 2011 in two editions; the "Optical Impression" edition and "Auditory Impression" edition. The first edition includes two songs "Vortex" and "Uncertain Sense", and a DVD containing the music video and making for the song "Vortex". The second edition comes with a bonus track "Break Me".

Track listing

Vortex: Optical Impression
Disc one
 "Vortex" - 4:07
 "Uncertain Sense" - 3:28
Disc two (DVD)
 "Vortex: Music Clip + Making" - 7:03

Vortex: Auditory Impression
 "Vortex" - 4:07
 "Uncertain Sense" - 3:28
 "Break Me" - 3:35

Notes
 The single was revealed a month before its initial release.
 Preview of the PV was shown a month before its initial release.
 The single reached a peak mark of #5 on the Japanese Oricon Weekly Charts.

References

2011 singles
The Gazette (band) songs
2011 songs
Sony Music Entertainment Japan singles
Song articles with missing songwriters